Ashish Vithal Rajadhyaksha (born 12 March 1957) is an Indian film scholar, art curator and cultural theorist. He was a Senior Fellow at the Bangalore-based Centre for the Study of Culture and Society.

Early life 
Ashish Vithal Rajadhyaksha was born on 12 March 1957 in Bombay (later renamed Mumbai), India. His father was a soldier in the Indian army. Rajadhyaksha's serious interest in cinema developed in the late 1970s. In 1978, he graduated from the University of Bombay with a Bachelor of Science degree.

Career 
Rajadhyaksha developed a keenness for Ritwik Ghatak's films after attending a course organised by the Film and Television Institute and the National Film Archive of India in the early 1980s. The first book that he authored was Ritwik Ghatak: A Return to the Epic, published in 1982. Starting in 1983, he wrote numerous articles for publications such as the Calcutta (now Kolkata)-based Journal of Arts & Ideas and the New Delhi-based Journal of the Moving Image. He authored, with Paul Willemen, Encyclopaedia of Indian Cinema in 1994. After a long hiatus, Rajadhyaksha's next book, a solo, was Indian Cinema in the Time of Celluloid: From Bollywood to the Emergency in 2009, followed by The Last Cultural Mile: An Inquiry into Technology and Governance in India in 2011, and Indian Cinema: A Very Short Introduction in 2016.

Personal life 
Rajadhyaksha was married to Pushpamala N., a Bangalore-based artist. The couple later divorced.

Books written

References 

1957 births
Film theorists
Indian film historians
Living people
People from Mumbai
University of Mumbai alumni